Chelonobacter is a genus of bacteria from the family of Pasteurellaceae with one known species (Chelonobacter oris). Chelonobacter oris is associated with diseases  of the respiratory tract of Hermann's tortoise (Testudo hermanni).

References

Pasteurellales
Bacteria genera
Monotypic bacteria genera